Dr. Percy L. Julian High School (formerly Robert E. Lee High School) is a public secondary school in Montgomery, Alabama, United States, serving grades 9–12.  The school is part of the Montgomery Public Schools system.

Dr. Percy L. Julian High School serves residents of the Gunter Air Force Base  and Maxwell Air Force Base.

History

Early history 
In January 1953, the Montgomery Board of Education purchased  of property on Ann Street for $74,000 for a new high school.  The new school would alleviate overcrowding at Sidney Lanier High School and accommodate children coming to Montgomery due to Maxwell and Gunter Air Force Bases.  The final cost of the new facility was nearly $1.25 million.

The school opened to students for the first time on September 6, 1955 under the name Robert E. Lee High School. The new school had 35 faculty members and approximately 800 students. Most of the 232 juniors and 173 seniors entering the school were transfers from Lanier, and some 354 sophomores moved up from area junior high schools. Its first graduating class consisted of 144 students.

Expansion
An auditorium was added in 1963. The guidance office, lunchroom, and library were enlarged and the math wing and mini-gym were added during the 1970s. By 1979 rooms were air conditioned, after students and teachers raised the necessary $80,000. In 1992, the library underwent extensive renovation and the entire school received a new roof. In 1997, land behind Julian formerly occupied by apartments was donated to the school, and in 2000 the space was completely paved to provide parking. In the summer of 2002, the entire school system was networked and wired with fiber optic cable to provide better and faster internet and network capabilities. Fine arts at the school have grown. The fine arts  program includes drama which perform plays in the Auditorium, Art, Debate, and  Choral .

The school added 9th Grade in the 2010/2011 school year. Julian High School's motto is The pursuit of continuous excellence.

Confederate legacy
The school included a plaque dedicated to its former namesake, Robert E. Lee, instructing students to not defame him.

Renaming 
In 2020 the school district's board of education voted to change the school's name.

In November 2022, it was announced that the school would be renamed Dr. Percy L. Julian High School.

Sports
The Generals represent the school in ASHAA sporting competitions. During the 2005–2006 and 2007–2008 school years the Generals Cheerleaders won the Cheersport National Championship.

State championships
Boys Basketball: 2020
Baseball: 1975
Boys' Cross Country: 1967
Football: 1958, 1959, 1960, 1969, 1970, 1979, 1986, 1991, 1992
Boys' golf: 1962, 1963, 1964, 1966, 1974
Boys' indoor track: 1968, 1969, 1970, 1971, 1974, 1978, 1979, 1980, 2017
Boys' outdoor track: 1961, 1968, 1970, 1971, 1978, 1979, 1980
Girls' outdoor track: 1981
Wrestling: 1957, 1978, 1980, 1984, 1992

Notable alumni
Brian Bass, Minnesota Twins baseball player
Fred Beasley, former Auburn University football player and NFL player
Terry Beasley, football player
Stephen "tWitch" Boss, dancer and actor
Antoine Caldwell, former University of Alabama football player and NFL player (Houston Texans)
Clint Compton, former MLB player (Chicago Cubs)
Lee Gross, former NFL player
Secdrick McIntyre, former NFL player
Eric Motley, public administrator
Michael O'Neill, actor
Wiley Peck, basketball player
Quentin Riggins, American player of gridiron football and member of Auburn University Board of Trustees
Tyrone Rogers, former Alabama State football player and NFL player.  Currently the Athletic Director for R.E. Lee HS
Henry Ruggs III, former University of Alabama football player and former NFL player
Tommy Shaw, from Styx
Trevis Smith, former University of Alabama football player and CFL player
Daniel Thomas, NFL player
Mike Washington, former NFL player
Fred Weary, former University of Tennessee football player and NFL player
Sam Williams, Ole Miss NFL player

References

External links
School website 
School Facebook Page

High schools in Montgomery, Alabama
Educational institutions established in 1955
Public high schools in Alabama
1955 establishments in Alabama
Name changes due to the George Floyd protests